Double Spring Branch is a  long 1st order tributary to Clarks Creek in Patrick County, Virginia.

Course 
Double Spring Branch rises about 5 miles east of Sulphur Springs, North Carolina in Surry County and then flows northwest into Virginia to join Clarks Creek about 1.5 miles south of The Hollow.

Watershed 
Double Spring Branch drains  of area, receives about 48.9 in/year of precipitation, has a wetness index of 286.10, and is about 71% forested.

See also 
 List of North Carolina Rivers
 List of Virginia Rivers

References 

Rivers of Surry County, North Carolina
Rivers of Patrick County, Virginia
Rivers of North Carolina
Rivers of Virginia